The  (THW, English: Federal Agency for Technical Relief) is the federal civil protection organisation of Germany. It is controlled by the German federal government. 97% of its more than 80 thousand members (2021) are volunteers.

Tasks 

The tasks of the THW are described in a law called THW-act.
These tasks are:
 technical and logistical support for other (German) GOs, NGOs or other authorities like fire brigades, police or the customs authorities
 technical or humanitarian relief in foreign countries, as assigned by the government
 technical relief in Germany as part of national civil protection measures.

History 
The main purpose of the THW was civil defense in the event of war. This has changed over the decades; today the THW intervenes in a wide spectrum of disasters, such as traffic accidents, industrial disasters, or earthquakes.

The largest disaster control action took place in August 2002 after the flooding of the Elbe river in eastern Germany. About 24,000 THW members participated in the operation, with up to 10,000 people helping simultaneously along the Elbe and its tributaries.

The largest engagement outside Germany was in France in 2000, after storms Lothar and Martin blew down power lines and trees, blocking many streets, between 26 and 28 December 1999. The main contribution was supplying temporary electrical power for hospitals and other important institutions and rebuilding parts of the electrical system.

The organisation has also been active in many disaster relief operations abroad, for example in Thailand and Sri Lanka after the 2004 Indian Ocean earthquake, in the United States after Hurricane Katrina in 2005, in Pakistan after the 2005 Kashmir earthquake, in 2010 during the flooding in Poland, the 2011 Tōhoku earthquake and tsunami in Japan, the April 2015 Nepal earthquake, and the 2020 Beirut explosions.

In 2021, the THW provided relief during major flooding in southwestern Germany, particularly in the Ahr Valley.

In February 2023, THW personnel deployed to Turkey in the aftermath of the 2023 Turkey–Syria earthquake.

Organization 

As a federal authority which is part of the Federal Ministry of the Interior, the THW is headed by a president and board.

The THW comprises 668 local chapters, 66 regional offices, 8 state associations, and the THW administration in Bonn, which consists of the management staff, the commissioner of volunteers, and the Deployment Section with the units E1 mission, E2 foreign, E3 training, E4 logistics, and E5 technology, and the Central Services Section with the units Z1 volunteers and staff, Z2 organization, Z3 finance, Z4 security and health protection, and Z5 information and communication.

The THW logistics center has its office in Heiligenhaus, and is, via its attachment to the Logistics Unit E4, part of the THW administration.

Field organization

Organization in Germany 
The THW is stationed all over Germany in 668 local chapters, called  (OV). Some 80,000 people are active in this organisation including about 15,000 young volunteers (members of the THW Youth). The majority of those are volunteers, while about 1,800 work full-time in its administration. Each local chapter maintains one or more  (technical platoons), each consisting of one  (command squad), comprising four volunteers, one  (rescue units) comprising nine to twelve volunteers, and one to three  (technical units), comprising four to eighteen volunteers.

The main type of THW unit is one of two  (1st and 2nd Rescue Groups), equipped with heavy tools like hydraulic cutting devices, chain saws, and pneumatic hammers.

The  (Technical Units) include:
 Bridge Building
 Debris Clearance
 Demolition/Blasting
 Electricity Supply 
 Emergency Supply and Maintenance, (introduced 2019 as a replacement for the former technical unit Illumination and many 2nd rescue units)
 Infrastructure
 Oil Pollution
 Search and Rescue
 Water Damage / Pumping
 Water Hazards
 Water Supply and Treatment
 Recovery

Furthermore, two types of technical units exist outside of technical platoons. They provide support mainly during major incidents or multi-regional operations:
 Logistics 
 Command, Control and Communications

International deployment 
For relief in foreign countries, there are four  or SEEBA (Rapid Deployment Unit Search and Rescue Abroad) units according to INSARAG standards, able to go airborne within six hours, and three  or SEEWA (Rapid Deployment Unit Water Supply and Treatment Abroad) units.

The Schlauchschwinger also operates high capacity pumping (HCP) modules for the EU Civil Protection Mechanism.

Furthermore, the THW has a pool of experts which can be rapidly deployed to places of crisis to perform assessment and coordination tasks within the fields of technical and logistical support. Those experts are also active in capacity building operations.

Services provided 

Technical threat prevention
 Area lighting
 Clearing and blasting
 Combating flooding and inundation
 Search and rescue, and salvage
 Water rescue

Infrastructure technical support
 Electricity supply
 Emergency bridge work
 Drinking water supply
 Waste water disposal

Command and communication, logistics
 Catering and care of operational staff
 Command center establishment and operation
 Command support
 Creation of temporary telecommunication systems
 Establishment and operation of logistical bases
 Maintenance of material, repair and maintenance work for mission equipment
 Transportation of consumer goods for mission demands

Technical support in the protection of the environment
 Fighting against oil damage
 Water analysis

Provision of the population
 Electricity and drinking water provision
 Establishment and equipment of emergency accommodation and collecting points with matching infrastructure
 Waste water disposal

Technical support
 Diving
 Makeshift road works
 Maintenance of civil protection facilities such as emergency wells and shelters
 Rescue from heights
 Technical help on traffic routes

Personnel 

In Germany, military service was mandatory for adult males until 2011. The THW was one of those organisations. Others were too, such as volunteer fire brigades and various organisations engaged in emergency medical service; however, the THW relied more heavily on such quasi-conscripts, as it tends to have less local popularity than, e. g., volunteer fire brigades (who tend to be the chief social club of their respective village or town-quarter), and as it had less of an infrastructure of paid employees than, for instance, the German Red Cross.

Ranks 
In general, the rank structure of the THW is divided into two groups: the volunteers and the full-time employees.

Volunteers

Full-time employees

Heads of THW 
 1952–1955: Otto Lummitzsch
 1955–1958: Alexander Löfken
 1958–1962: Rudolf Schmidt
 1962–1977: Hans Zielinski
 1977–1985: Hermann Ahrens
 1985/1986: Helmut Meier
 1986–2002: Gerd Jürgen Henkel
 2002–2006: Georg Thiel
 2006-2020: 
 since 2020:

The  (THW Youth) is the youth organization of the THW. It has set itself the target to introduce boys and girls from the age of six in a playful way to the work of the THWs. The  is not part of the Federal Agency for Technical Relief, but is an independently registered charity. This arrangement was made in order to avoid maintaining a state youth organization.

See also 
 Civil defense or Civil defense by country
 State Emergency Service — a similar organization in Australia

References

External links 

 Official THW-homepage in German
 Official THW-homepage in English

German federal agencies
Emergency services in Germany
Federal authorities in Bonn
Emergency organizations